The Queen's Prize individual event took place on the 27 to 29 July 2014 at the Barry Buddon Shooting Centre. The winners were determined by the number of points each person had at the end of the third day.

Results

References

Shooting at the 2014 Commonwealth Games